First Visit is an album by saxophonist David Liebman which was recorded in Tokyo in 1973 and originally released on the Japanese Philips label before being reissued by West 54 Records in 1980 and on CD by West Wind Records in 1991.

Track listing 
All compositions by David Liebman except where noted
 "Man-Child" (Richie Beirach) – 12:11
 "Vedana" (Dave Holland) – 10:07
 "'Round About Midnight" (Thelonious Monk, Cootie Williams, Bernie Hanighen) – 7:49
 "Rommy's Hut" – 3:29
 "Lonnie's Song" – 3:04
 "First Visit" – 8:55

Personnel 
David Liebman – tenor saxophone, soprano saxophone, flute
Richard Beirach – piano
Dave Holland – bass
Jack DeJohnette – drums

References 

 

Dave Liebman albums
1973 albums
Philips Records albums
West 54 Records albums
West Wind Records albums